Christopher of Werle, Prince of the Wends (born: before 1385; died: 25 August 1425) was from 1395 or earlier to 1425, Lord of Werle-Goldberg and Werle-Waren.  He succeeded his father, who died between 1385 and 1395.  He was the son of John VI of Werle and Agnes, a daughter of  Nicholas IV of Werle-Goldberg.

After his father's death, his brother Nicholas V ruled alone until Christopher came of age; from 1401, they ruled jointly.  After Nicholas V died in 1408, Christopher ruled alone.  He began calling himself "Prince of the Wends" on 4 May 1418 on the basis of chronicles written by Bishop Otto of Havelberg, which he regarded as evidence for his royal descent.  He was probably killed on 25 August 1425 during a battle at Pritzwalk against troops from Brandenburg.

He was probably unmarried and definitely childless.  With his death, the Werle-Goldberg line died out and Werle-Goldberg fell to his cousin William.

External links 
 Genealogical table of the House of Mecklenburg
 Biographical information on Christopher on emecklenburg.de

Lords of Werle
House of Mecklenburg
14th-century births
Year of birth uncertain
1425 deaths
14th-century German nobility
15th-century German people